Ingryd Fernanda Silva de Lima (born 24 November 1997), simply known as Ingryd, is a Brazilian professional footballer who plays as a midfielder for Ferroviária and the Brazil women's national team.

Club career

On 29 December 2021, Corinthians announced the departure of Ingryd as her contract was expiring. Three days later, she was announced as the new addition of Ferroviária on a two-year deal.

International career
In March 2022, Ingryd was called up to the Brazil national team by manager Pia Sundhage, for two friendlies against Spain and Hungary. She made her full international debut on 7 April, replacing Angelina in a 1–1 draw against the former.

Career statistics

International

Honours

Club
Corinthians
Campeonato Paulista de Futebol Feminino: 2019, 2020, 2021
Copa Libertadores Femenina: 2019, 2021
Campeonato Brasileiro de Futebol Feminino Série A1: 2020, 2021

References

1997 births
Living people
People from Maceió
Brazilian women's footballers
Women's association football midfielders
Campeonato Brasileiro de Futebol Feminino Série A1 players
Sport Club Corinthians Paulista (women) players
Associação Ferroviária de Esportes (women) players
Sportspeople from Alagoas